Mustafa Yılmaz (born 5 November 1992) is a Turkish chess player who received the FIDE title of Grandmaster (GM) in September 2012. He is a three-time Turkish Chess Champion.

In the July 2013 FIDE rating list, he was ranked number 407 among active players in the world and number 6 in Turkey. He earned the titles of FIDE Master (FM) in 2008 and International Master (IM) in 2009. He is a native of Mamak in Ankara.

Yılmaz began playing chess at the age of seven, encouraged by his older sister Ezgi Yılmaz, also a Turkish chess champion. He attended the same chess course in Mamak, Ankara with Kübra Öztürk, who became a Woman Grandmaster (WGM).

In 2008, Yılmaz was admitted to the Turkish national chess team. The same year, he took part in the 38th Chess Olympiad held in Dresden, Germany. In 2009, he became the youngest Turkish chess champion, defeating Barış Esen in the final round and reaching a total score of 11½/13.

At the initiative of the Turkish Chess Federation, in 2012 he entered the Chess Department of Russian State Social University in Moscow along with Burak Fırat and Demre Kerigan; to receive instruction from chess masters and to learn Russian.

In January 2023, Yılmaz finished second in the Tata Steel Challengers and reaching a total score of 9/13.

Achievements
Turkish Chess Championship
 2009 – champion
 2017 – champion 
 2022 – champion 

World Junior Chess Championship
 2012 – 19th place

References

External links
 
 

1992 births
Living people
Turkish chess players
Chess grandmasters
Chess Olympiad competitors
Turkish expatriate sportspeople in Russia